Dominic Couzens is a British birdwatcher, author and journalist specialising in avian and natural history subjects.<ref name="Pearson">Pearson, Louisa (2005) "Birds of a Feather", The Scotsman, 10 September 2005, retrieved 2010-12-04</ref>

He contributes regularly to Bird Watching and BBC Wildlife magazines; and is also a professional field trip guide. His books The Secret Lives of Garden Birds, The Secret Lives of British Birds, and The Secret Lives of Garden Wildlife all received praise, with the former selected by The Guardian as one of the best wildlife books of 2004, an accolade also received by the Secret Lives of British Birds, and the latter picked as one of the best new nature books of Spring 2008 by The Times.

In 2021, Couzens was awarded with the Dilys Breese Medal of the British Trust for Ornithology.

BibliographyThe Mitchell Beazley Pocket Guide to Garden Birds (1996), Mitchell Beazley, Wings Guide to British Birds (1997), Collins, Collins Birds of Britain and Ireland (2001), Collins, Collins Birds By Behaviour (2003), Collins, The Secret Lives of Garden Birds (2004), A&C Black, The Complete Back Garden Birdwatcher New Holland Publishers (2005) Identifying British Birds  Collins (2005) Identifying Birds by Behaviour  Collins (2005) Bird Migration New Holland Publishers, (2005) Birds: A Complete Guide to all British and European Species (2005), Collins, Secret Lives of British Birds (2006), Christopher Helm, Secret Lives of Garden Wildlife (2008), A&C Black, Extreme Birds: From the fastest to the smartest (2008), Collins, Top 100 Birding Sites of the World (2008), New Holland, Atlas of Rare Birds (2010), MIT Press, Top Birding Sites of Europe (2011), New Holland, Garden Bird Confidential'' (2011), Hamlyn,

References

Year of birth missing (living people)
Living people
British nature writers
Birdwatchers